Francis J. Rotch (February 15, 1863 – May 25, 1918) was an American politician in the state of Washington. He served in the Washington House of Representatives from 1889 to 1891.

References

Republican Party members of the Washington House of Representatives
1863 births
1918 deaths
Politicians from Albany, New York
19th-century American politicians